Johan Leutscher (born 26 July 1964) is a Dutch rower. He competed in the men's coxless four event at the 1988 Summer Olympics.

References

1964 births
Living people
Dutch male rowers
Olympic rowers of the Netherlands
Rowers at the 1988 Summer Olympics
People from Drachten
Sportspeople from Friesland